LBW or lbw may refer to:

Laser beam welding
Leg before wicket, a way in which a batter can be dismissed in cricket
Linux Bier Wanderung or Linux Beer Hike, a yearly event
Low birth weight of a child, defined as less than 2,500 grams
London Borough of Wandsworth, UK
Lutheran Book of Worship, Evangelical Lutheran Church, America
Landing Barge, Water, a type of World War 2 ship